Alabama Moon is a 2006 novel by Watt Key. The story follows the adventures of Alabama native Moon Blake.

Following the release of the published work, a movie based upon the book titled Alabama Moon was released September 27, 2009.

Synopsis
After the death of his father, ten-year-old Moon leaves their forest shelter home and is sent to an Alabama institution, becoming entangled in the outside world he has never known and making good friends, a relentless enemy, and finally a new life.

References

2006 American novels
2006 debut novels
American novels adapted into films
Farrar, Straus and Giroux books
Novels set in Alabama
Southern United States in fiction
Square Fish books